Johannes Marijnus Antonius Maria "Jan" de Wit (born 10 May 1945) is a former Dutch politician and lawyer. As a member of the Socialist Party (Socialistische Partij) he was an MP from 19 May 1998 to 1 April 2014. He focused on matters of judiciary and aliens policy. From 1995 to 1998, he was a Senator.

Biography 
de Wit studied public law at Tilburg University. For a brief time, he worked as a lawyer in Eindhoven and thereafter for many years in Maastricht and Heerlen.

In 1972, he joined the Socialist Party, which had just been founded in 1971. From 1972 to 1996, he was a local party executive, and from 1988 to 1992, he was also a party executive on the national level. Furthermore, he was an SP councillor of Heerlen from 1982 to 1995 and chairman of SP's think tank foundation until 1997.

In 1995, de Wit was elected into the Dutch Senate; he was the sole representative of the SP until 1998. In 1998, he exchanged the Senate for the Dutch House of Representatives.

As an MP, de Wit was a member of the parliamentary inquiry on construction, a member of the Presidium and former chairman of the standing committee for social affairs and employment. Since 2010, he has been chairman of the parliamentary inquiry on the financial system.

Personal life 
They have three children. Raised as a Catholic, he turned non-religious later on.

References 
  Parlement.com biography

External links 

  House of Representatives of the Netherlands

1945 births
Living people
Dutch atheists
20th-century Dutch lawyers
Former Roman Catholics
Members of the House of Representatives (Netherlands)
Members of the Senate (Netherlands)
Municipal councillors in Limburg (Netherlands)
People from Heerlen
People from Moerdijk
Socialist Party (Netherlands) politicians
Tilburg University alumni
21st-century Dutch politicians